Kampol Pathomakkakul (born 27 July 1992) is a Thai professional footballer who plays as an goalkeeper for Thai League 1 club Ratchaburi Mitr Phol and the Thailand national team.

International career
He was named in head coach Milovan Rajevac's squad for the 2018 FIFA World Cup qualification in August 2017, but did not make an appearance.

In 2022, He was named in Alexandré Pölking's squad for the AFF Mitsubishi Electric Cup 2022 in December 2022. In this tournament, he got a champion and make 2 appearances.

Honours

International
Thailand
 AFF Championship (1): 2022

References

External links
 

1992 births
Living people
Kampol Pathomakkakul
Kampol Pathomakkakul
Association football goalkeepers
Kampol Pathomakkakul
Kampol Pathomakkakul
Kampol Pathomakkakul
Kampol Pathomakkakul
Kampol Pathomakkakul
Kampol Pathomakkakul
Kampol Pathomakkakul
Kampol Pathomakkakul
Kampol Pathomakkakul
Kampol Pathomakkakul
Kampol Pathomakkakul
Kampol Pathomakkakul